Liberalism in Georgia is a political and moral philosophy based on what liberals consider the unalienable rights of the individual. The fundamental liberal ideals of freedom of speech, freedom of the press, freedom of religion, the separation of church and state, the right to due process and equality under the law are widely accepted as a common foundation of liberalism. 

History of Liberalism in Georgia can be split into two - the first period began in 1860s with the Tergdaleulebi movement and ended in 1921, when the Georgia was sovietized; second period began in 1991 with Georgia declaring its independence from the Soviet Union. Liberalism in Georgia was persecuted severely both by the Russian Empire and the Soviet Union.

The first period liberalism in Georgia is closely associated with the leader of intellectual movement named "Tergdaleulebi" - prince Ilia Chavchavadze. Ilia Chavchavadze was a Georgian public figure, journalist, publisher,  writer and poet who spearheaded the revival of the Georgian national movement in the second half of the 19th century and played a major role in the creation of Georgian civil society during the Russian rule of Georgia. He is Georgia's "most universally revered hero."

Five Georgian political parties - Republican, Free Democrats, Strategy Aghmashenebeli, Lelo and Girchi — More Freedom - are members of Alliance of Liberals and Democrats for Europe Party. The Europe-Georgia Institute is an affiliate member of European Liberal Forum.

Sources

References

Liberalism in Georgia
Georgia
Political movements in Georgia (country)